Radosław Pruchnik (born 11 October 1986) is a Polish retired footballer who played as a midfielder.

Career

Club
In June 2011, he joined ŁKS Łódź on a two-year contract.

On 28 February 2017 he was loaned to GKS Tychy. On 18 July 2018, he was announced to be the Legia Warsaw II player.

References

External links 
 

Living people
1986 births
Polish footballers
ŁKS Łódź players
Flota Świnoujście players
Amica Wronki players
Arka Gdynia players
Górnik Łęczna players
GKS Tychy players
Legia Warsaw II players
Ekstraklasa players
I liga players
II liga players
III liga players
Footballers from Warsaw
Association football midfielders